Joseph Precott Pitman (August 21, 1924 – June 1, 2018) was an American weightlifter who competed in the 1948 Summer Olympics. He was born in Laconia, New Hampshire. Pitman is on the wall of fame at the United States Olympic Training Center.

See also
Weightlifting at the 1951 Pan American Games
Weightlifting at the 1955 Pan American Games

References

1924 births
2018 deaths
People from Laconia, New Hampshire
Sportspeople from New Hampshire
American male weightlifters
Olympic weightlifters of the United States
Weightlifters at the 1948 Summer Olympics
Pan American Games medalists in weightlifting
Pan American Games gold medalists for the United States
People associated with physical culture
Weightlifters at the 1951 Pan American Games
Medalists at the 1951 Pan American Games